Aghelak (also Romanized as Āghlak and Āgholak; also known as Āqā Lak and Āqlak) is a village in Qahan Rural District, Khalajastan District, Qom County, Qom Province, Iran. At the 2006 census, its population was 114, in 36 families.

References 

Populated places in Qom Province